Cladonia is a large genus of lichens in the family Cladoniaceae. , Species Fungorum lists 233 species in the genus.

A

Cladonia acervata 
Cladonia ahtii  
Cladonia alaskana  
Cladonia albofuscescens  
Cladonia albonigra  
Cladonia aleuropoda  
Cladonia alpina Yoshim. (1968)
Cladonia amaurocraea  
Cladonia anaemica  
Cladonia andesita  
Cladonia angustata  
Cladonia appalachensis  
Cladonia apodocarpa  
Cladonia arbuscula  
Cladonia archeri  
Cladonia arcuata  
Cladonia argentea  
Cladonia asahinae  
Cladonia atlantica A.Evans (1944) 
Cladonia atrans  
Cladonia attacta  
Cladonia awasthiana

B

Cladonia bacillaris  
Cladonia bacilliformis 
Cladonia bahiana 
Cladonia bangii 
Cladonia bellidiflora  
Cladonia berghsonii 
Cladonia bimberiensis  
Cladonia borbonica  
Cladonia borealis  
Cladonia botryocarpa 
Cladonia botrytes  
Cladonia brasiliensis 
Cladonia brevis  
Cladonia bungartzii

C

Cladonia caespiticia 
Cladonia callosa  
Cladonia calycantha 
Cladonia calycanthoides 
Cladonia calyciformis 
Cladonia camerunensis 
Cladonia capitellata 
Cladonia caribaea 
Cladonia cariosa 
Cladonia carneola 
Cladonia cartilaginea 
Cladonia cayennensis 
Cladonia celata 
Cladonia cenotea 
Cladonia ceratophylla 
Cladonia cervicornis 
Cladonia chimantae 
Cladonia chlorophaea 
Cladonia chondrotypa 
Cladonia ciliata 
Cladonia cineracea 
Cladonia cinerella 
Cladonia clathrata 
Cladonia coccifera 
Cladonia coccocarpa  
Cladonia complanata  
Cladonia compressa 
Cladonia concinna 
Cladonia confragosa 
Cladonia confusa 
Cladonia coniocraea 
Cladonia consimilis 
Cladonia corallifera 
Cladonia corniculata 
Cladonia cornuta 
Cladonia corsicana 
Cladonia corymbescens 
Cladonia corymbosula 
Cladonia crassiuscula 
Cladonia crispata 
Cladonia crispatula 
Cladonia cristatella 
Cladonia crustacea 
Cladonia cryptochlorophaea 
Cladonia cucullata 
Cladonia curta 
Cladonia cyanescens  
Cladonia cyanopora 
Cladonia cyathomorpha 
Cladonia cylindrica

D
Cladonia dactylota 
Cladonia darwinii 
Cladonia decorticata 
Cladonia deformis 
Cladonia dendroides 
Cladonia densissima 
Cladonia didyma 
Cladonia digitata 
Cladonia dilleniana 
Cladonia dimorpha 
Cladonia dimorphoclada 
Cladonia dissecta 
Cladonia divaricata 
Cladonia diversa 
Cladonia dunensis

E

Cladonia ecmocyna 
Cladonia elixii 
Cladonia enantia 
Cladonia evansii

F
Cladonia farinophylla 
Cladonia fimbriata 
Cladonia firma 
Cladonia fissidens 
Cladonia flabelliformis 
Cladonia flagellaris 
Cladonia flammea  – Falkland Islands
Cladonia flavocrispata 
Cladonia fleigiae 
Cladonia floerkeana 
Cladonia floridana 
Cladonia foliacea 
Cladonia fragosa 
Cladonia friabilis 
Cladonia fruticulosa 
Cladonia furcata 
Cladonia furfuracea 
Cladonia furfuraceoides 
Cladonia fuscofunda

G

Cladonia galindezii 
Cladonia gallowayi 
Cladonia glabra 
Cladonia glacialis 
Cladonia glauca 
Cladonia glebosa 
Cladonia gracilis 
Cladonia graeca 
Cladonia granulosa 
Cladonia grayi 
Cladonia grisea 
Cladonia guianensis 
Cladonia gumboskii  – Brazil

H
Cladonia halei 
Cladonia hammeri 
Cladonia hians 
Cladonia homchantarae 
Cladonia homosekikaica 
Cladonia huberi 
Cladonia humilis 
Cladonia hypomelaena 
Cladonia hypoxantha 
Cladonia hypoxanthoides

I

Cladonia ibitipocae 
Cladonia ignatii 
Cladonia imbricarica  – Iceland
Cladonia imbricata 
Cladonia imperialis  – Minas Gerais
Cladonia incerta 
Cladonia incrassata 
Cladonia indica 
Cladonia inflata 
Cladonia innominata 
Cladonia insolita  – Uganda
Cladonia isabellina 
Cladonia isidiifera 
Cladonia islandica 
Cladonia itatiaiae

J
Cladonia jakutica 
Cladonia jaliscana

K
Cladonia kalbii 
Cladonia krempelhuberi 
Cladonia kriegeri 
Cladonia krogiana 
Cladonia kuringaiensis

L

Cladonia lacryma 
Cladonia latiloba 
Cladonia leporina 
Cladonia leprocephala  – Venezuela
Cladonia leucophylla  – Kenya
Cladonia lichexanthonica  – Brazil
Cladonia lingulata  – Dominican Republic
Cladonia litoralis 
Cladonia longisquama  – Seychelles
Cladonia lopezii  – Venezuela
Cladonia luteoalba 
Cladonia lutescens  – India

M

Cladonia maasii 
Cladonia macilenta 
Cladonia macilentoides 
Cladonia macrophylla 
Cladonia macrophylliza 
Cladonia macrophyllodes 
Cladonia maculata 
Cladonia marcellii 
Cladonia maritima 
Cladonia mateocyatha 
Cladonia maxima 
Cladonia mediterranea 
Cladonia megaphylla 
Cladonia melanopoda 
Cladonia meridensis 
Cladonia meridionalis 
Cladonia merochlorophaea 
Cladonia metacorallifera 
Cladonia metaminiata 
Cladonia mexicana 
Cladonia microphylla 
Cladonia microscypha 
Cladonia minarum 
Cladonia miniata 
Cladonia minisaxicola  – Brazil
Cladonia mitis 
Cladonia mollis 
Cladonia mongkolsukii 
Cladonia monomorpha 
Cladonia multiformis 
Cladonia multipartita 
Cladonia murrayi 
Cladonia mutabilis

N
Cladonia nana 
Cladonia nashii 
Cladonia neozelandica 
Cladonia nitens 
Cladonia nitidella 
Cladonia norvegica 
Cladonia novochlorophaea 
Cladonia nudicaulis

O
Cladonia obscurata 
Cladonia obtecta 
Cladonia ochracea 
Cladonia ochrochlora 
Cladonia oricola

P

Cladonia paeminosa 
Cladonia pallens 
Cladonia palmicola 
Cladonia paranaensis 
Cladonia parasitica 
Cladonia parva 
Cladonia parvipes 
Cladonia penicillata 
Cladonia perfilata 
Cladonia persphacelata 
Cladonia pertricosa 
Cladonia peziziformis 
Cladonia phyllophora 
Cladonia piedadensis 
Cladonia pityrophylla 
Cladonia pleurota 
Cladonia pocillum 
Cladonia polydactyla 
Cladonia polyscypha 
Cladonia polystomata 
Cladonia polytypa 
Cladonia portentosa 
Cladonia praetermissa 
Cladonia prancei 
Cladonia pseudofissa 
Cladonia pseudotapperi 
Cladonia pulchra 
Cladonia pulverulenta 
Cladonia pulvinella 
Cladonia pulviniformis 
Cladonia pumila 
Cladonia pycnoclada 
Cladonia pyxidata

R

Cladonia ramulosa 
Cladonia rangiferina 
Cladonia rangiformis 
Cladonia rappii 
Cladonia ravenelii 
Cladonia recta 
Cladonia recticaulis 
Cladonia rei 
Cladonia rhodoleuca 
Cladonia rigida 
Cladonia robbinsii 
Cladonia robusta 
Cladonia rotundata 
Cladonia rudis 
Cladonia rugicaulis 
Cladonia rugulosa 
Cladonia rupununii

S

Cladonia salmonea 
Cladonia salzmannii 
Cladonia sandstedei 
Cladonia sarmentosa 
Cladonia scabriuscula 
Cladonia scholanderi 
Cladonia scotteri 
Cladonia secundana 
Cladonia signata 
Cladonia singhii 
Cladonia sinoaltaica 
Cladonia sipmanii 
Cladonia sobolescens 
Cladonia solida 
Cladonia southlandica 
Cladonia spathulata 
Cladonia sphacelata 
Cladonia spiculata 
Cladonia spinea 
Cladonia sprucei 
Cladonia squamosa 
Cladonia staufferi 
Cladonia stellaris 
Cladonia stenroosiae 
Cladonia stereoclada 
Cladonia steyermarkii 
Cladonia stipitata 
Cladonia strangulata 
Cladonia strepsilis 
Cladonia stricta 
Cladonia stygia 
Cladonia subcariosa 
Cladonia subcervicornis 
Cladonia subdelicatula 
Cladonia subfimbriata 
Cladonia subfurcata 
Cladonia subincrassata 
Cladonia subminiata 
Cladonia subpityrea 
Cladonia subradiata 
Cladonia subreticulata 
Cladonia subsphacelata 
Cladonia subsquamosa 
Cladonia substellata 
Cladonia subsubulata 
Cladonia subtenuis 
Cladonia subulata 
Cladonia sufflata 
Cladonia sulphurina 
Cladonia sumatrana 
Cladonia symphoriza 
Cladonia symphycarpa

T
Cladonia tachirae 
Cladonia tasmanica 
Cladonia tenerrima 
Cladonia termitarum 
Cladonia tessellata 
Cladonia testaceopallens 
Cladonia transcendens 
Cladonia trassii 
Cladonia turgida 
Cladonia turgidior

U

Cladonia uliginosa 
Cladonia umbellata 
Cladonia uncialis 
Cladonia usambarensis 
Cladonia ustulata

V
Cladonia vescula

W
Cladonia wainioi 
Cladonia weymouthii

Z
Cladonia zebrathallina  – Brazil
Cladonia zopfii

References

Cladonia